Rensil D'Silva is an Indian film director, screenplay writer, ad film maker and advertising agency Creative Director.

Career
Rensil D'Silva started his career in feature films as a Story writer for the 2001 movie, Aks. Later he wrote the screenplay for movies such as Shoebite/ Johnny Mastana (2008) and Rang De Basanti, a 2006 patriotic drama which received wide critical acclaim as well as commercial success and won numerous Indian Film Awards including a nomination for BAFTA Award for Best Film Not in the English Language at the 2007 British Academy of Film and Television Arts awards. Ace film director Karan Johar recognized his talent and offered him to direct his movie Kurbaan under his own Dharma Productions for which the screenplay was written by D'Silva himself. The film was nominated for several Indian awards. In 2011 he wrote the screenplay for Karan Johar's feature film Student Of The Year. During the same period, he wrote the story and screenplay for his next directorial venture, Ungli. Rensil D'Silva has also written and directed the Indian version of the international TV series, 24, starring Anil Kapoor (2013). This he has done for both Seasons 1 & 2. He has also worked extensively with directors as diverse as Karan Johar, Mani Ratnam, Shoojit Sircar and David Dhawan. Besides feature film director, Rensil has been an advertising Creative Director for nearly two decades. He has worked in Agencies like JWT, Rediffusion, Saatchi & Saatchi, Mudra DDB, Ogilvy and Mather and has started O&M's second agency Meridian in 2008. He is also an ad filmmaker of repute. During the course of his two decades in advertising he has won numerous international and national awards.

Filmography

As a director
 Kurbaan (2009)
 Ungli (2014) 
 24 (2013–2016)
 Dial 100 (2021) 

As a writer
 Aks (2001)
 Rang De Basanti (2006)
 Kurbaan (2009)
 Student of the Year (2012)
 24 (2013–2016)
 Ungli (2014)Thambi (2019) (Tamil)
 Dial 100'' (2021)

References

External links
 

Living people
Film directors from Mumbai
Hindi-language film directors
Filmfare Awards winners
Film and Television Institute of India alumni
Indian television directors
Year of birth missing (living people)